The river catfish (Cephalocassis jatia) is a species of catfish in the family Ariidae. It was described by Francis Buchanan-Hamilton in 1822, originally under the genus Pimelodus. It inhabits freshwater bodies and marine waters in Bangladesh, India and Myanmar.

The breeding season for river catfish is said to be between May and July. These fishes usually inhabit Tonle Sap Lake, Cambodia.

References

Ariidae
Fish described in 1822